The 1964 Kvalifikationsturneringen (Danish: Danmarksturneringens Kvalifikationsturnering 1964) was the fourteenth edition of the Danish fourth-tier association football division since its establishment in 1950 as part of the Danmarksturneringen's nation-wide league structure. Governed by the Danish FA, the season was launched in March 1964, and the last round of matches concluded on 15 November 1964. KFUM København and BK Rødovre entered as relegated teams from last season's third division, while IK Viking, BK Dalgas, Assens G&IK, IF Fuglebakken, Brønderslev IF, B 1921 and Holte IF entered as promoted teams from the 1963 Bornholm Series, 1963 Copenhagen Series, 1963 Funen Series, 1963 Jutland Series, 1963 Lolland-Falster Series and 1963 Zealand Series respectively. The twelve teams in the division entered the 1964–65 Danish Cup in the cup tournament's qualifying rounds. Fixtures for the 1964 season were announced on 6 January 1964.

BK Fremad Amager won the league, securing their first fourth-tier division title, and returning to the third-tier league after a two-years absence, with IF Fuglebakken becoming the runners-up, gaining promotion to the third-tier league for the first time in the club's history. At the end of the season, the seven clubs with the fewest points in the final league standings, Frederiksberg BK, BK Rødovre, Holte IF, BK Dalgas, Brønderslev IF, B 1921 and Assens G&IK, were relegated to the regional top-flight leagues. Bjarne Hinrichsen of Frederiksberg BK became the league's top scorer, netting a total of 21 goals.

Summary
Fixtures for the 1964 season were announced by the Danish FA's tournament committee on 6 January 1964, and featured a nine weeks long summer break.

BK Fremad Amager and IF Fuglebakken both secured their promotions to the third-tier on 26 October 1964 by winning their home games against BK Dalgas and B 1921 respectively, while the then closest competitor Kalundborg GF&BK only managed to tie their away game against Assens G&IK – gaining a seven-point lead with just two rounds remaining. The league division title was determined and won by BK Fremad Amager on match 22. The award ceremony was held during the break of the match between IK Viking and BK Fremad Amager on 15 November with the Danish FA's representative Preben Engset (Svaneke) presenting the league trophy to the captain of BK Fremad Amager.

Teams

Twelve teams competed in the league – three teams from the previous season, two teams relegated from the third tier and seven teams promoted from the regional top-flight leagues of Bornholm, Copenhagen, Funen, Jutland, Lolland-Falster and Zealand. The promoted teams were Brønderslev IF, IF Fuglebakken, Holte IF, Assens G&IK, BK Dalgas, all five clubs entered the fourth-tier league for the first time in their history, B 1921, returning after a two-year absence, and IK Viking, returning after a one-year absence. They replaced Silkeborg IF, Brande IF, Otterup B&IK, Holstebro BK, Rønne IK, Vorup-Frederiksberg BK and Helsingør IF, ending their fourth-tier spells of one, one, one, one, one, two and two years respectively. The relegated teams were KFUM København and BK Rødovre, both entered the fourth nation-wide division for the first time, replacing Svendborg fB, who entered the third division for the first time, ending their spell in the fourth-tier of two years, and Nakskov BK, who returned to the third division after a four years absence.

Stadiums and locations

Personnel

Coaching changes

League table

Results

Statistics

Scoring

Top scorers

Hat-tricks

Discipline

Player
 Most warnings: 1
  Jørgen Nielsen (IF Fuglebakken) on 23 August 1964 against BK Fremad Amager
  Ib Petersen (BK Fremad Amager) on 25 October 1964 against BK Dalgas - the player had previously received two warnings in two other matches
 Most evictions: 1
  John H. Petersen (BK Dalgas) on 15 November 1964 against Kalundborg GF&BK

Club
 Most evictions: 1
 BK Dalgas

References

1963–64 in European fourth tier association football leagues
1964–65 in European fourth tier association football leagues
1963–64 in Danish football
1964–65 in Danish football